Čop may refer to:

 Čop, Ukraine
 Čop (surname)